Lucchi may refer to:

 Francesca Lucchi (or Fanny Salvini-Donatelli; c.1815 – 1891) was an Italian operatic soprano
 Giovanni Lucchi (1942–2012), Italian bow maker who founded the first school of bow making in Italy.
 Marcellino Lucchi (born 1957), Italian former Grand Prix motorcycle road racer
 Michele De Lucchi (born 1951), Italian architect and designer
 Sabrina Lucchi (born 1968), Italian former professional tennis player

See also 
 Lucchini (disambiguation)

Surnames of Italian origin